Abdulvehab Ilhamija Žepčevi (1773 – 1821) was a Bosnian dervish and prose writer.

In addition to Bosnian, his work was written in Turkish, Arabic and Persian.

Name
His name Abd-ul-vehhab means "Servant of the Generous" — one of the attributes of God. Ilhamija, his Dervish name, means "inspired."

Early life
Ilhamija was born into a Muslim Bosniak family in Žepče, Sanjak of Bosnia, Ottoman Empire (today's Bosnia and Herzegovina). His father's name was Abdulvehab. Both his parents died during his youth. A quote from one of his poems is "A mother I do not have, and my father I do not remember."

Ilhamija was educated in his birth town and in Tešanj and Fojnica. He also attended the Ferhadija Mosque in Tešanj.

His final work, the Bosnian Book of the Science of Conduct, is a work that lists 54 religious duties that each follower of Islam must know about, believe in, and fulfill, followed by advice on what a religious person should and should not do. It was published posthumously in 1831, a decade after his death. The book is printed in Arebica, the variant of Perso-Arabic script used to write Bosnian language, mainly between the 15th and 19th centuries, after the conquest of Bosnia by the Ottoman Empire.

Execution
In the year 1820, a man named Dželaludin-paša became the Ottoman pasha of Bosnia, a title he would hold until his brutal death in 1821. At first, Abdulvehab Ilhamija supported Dželaludin, believing him to be a fair and just ruler. But over a short period of time the illusion faded and Abdulvehab Ilhamija openly criticized Dželaludin's harsh rule over the Bosnian population in his poetry and writings.

In 1821, Dželaludin became aware of Ilhamija's criticisms and invited him to his home in Travnik. Ilhamija traveled without a horse, on foot from Žepče to Travnik. Before he left, he bid a final farewell to his family and friends, anticipating a grim ending to his meeting with the pasha.

To this day, what happened in Travnik remains in the sphere of assumption. There is a legend that says that Dželaludin-paša asked of Ilhamija to renounce his critical writings, when Ilhamija refused to do so, he was either strangled to death or decapitated in the Travnik Castle.

News of his death was received with sorrow and revolt among the people. He was buried in Travnik in mausoleum near a former railway station and former hospital, where he remained buried for 138 years until 1959, when his bones and headstone were moved to a different grave.

Partial list of works
The publication years for his works remains unknown.
Boga traži i plači (Seek God and Cry)
Čudan zeman nastade (There Was a Strange Zeman)
Dervišluk je čudan rahat (Being a Dervish is a Strange Comfort)
Dobro ti ders nadgledaj! (Look at Your Lessons Well!)
Dženet saraj (Heavenly Palace)
Hajat dok je... (While Life Is...)
Hajde sinak te uči (Come and Learn, Son)
Ja upitah svog Jasina (I Asked My Soul)
Ne rastaj se od sufara
Potlje Boga...
Uči, sinak, i piši! (Learn, Son, and Write!)
Ustrajte u sticanju znanja! (Persevere in Gaining Knowledge!)
Bosnian Book of the Science of Conduct (1831); published posthumously

In popular culture
Fellow Bosniak writer Muhamed Hadžijamaković wrote a biography of Abdulvehab Ilhamija entitled Ilhamija: Život i djelo (Ilhamija: Life and Work).

Rešad Kadić (1912–1988) wrote a book about Abdulvehab Ilhamija's death entitled Ilhamijin put u smrt (Ilhamija's Journey to Death), originally published in 1976.

References

1773 births
1821 deaths
People from Žepče
People from the Ottoman Empire of Bosnian descent
Bosniaks of Bosnia and Herzegovina
Bosnia and Herzegovina Muslims
Bosnia and Herzegovina writers
Bosniak writers
Bosniak poets
18th-century poets from the Ottoman Empire
19th-century poets from the Ottoman Empire
18th-century writers from the Ottoman Empire
19th-century writers from the Ottoman Empire
Executed people from the Ottoman Empire
19th-century executions by the Ottoman Empire
People from Zenica-Doboj Canton
Executed Bosnia and Herzegovina people